Parunovac is a settlement in the municipality of Kruševac, Serbia. According to the 2002 census, the settlement has a population of  4753 people.

References

Populated places in Rasina District